Bees Airline was a Ukrainian low-cost airline, which commenced operations in March 2021. Its head office was in Kyiv.

History
The airline was established in late 2019. The airline received its AOC in March 2021. It operated low cost regular and charter flights from Ukraine to Greece, Cyprus, Bulgaria, Egypt, Turkey, Georgia, Armenia, Montenegro and Spain with 4 aircraft and planned to increase the fleet size to six aircraft in 2022.

On 29 April 2021, the airline operated its first regular flight: from Kyiv to Yerevan. Due to martial law on the territory of Ukraine and the closure of the airspace of Ukraine, all flights from 24 February 2022 were canceled. The airline's AOC was revoked later in summer 2022 due to the airline not having any aircraft.

Destinations 
Bees Airline operated scheduled and charter international and domestic flights to the following destinations:

Armenia: Yerevan
Azerbaijan: Ganja
Bulgaria: Varna, Burgas
Cyprus: Larnaca
Czech Republic: Prague
Egypt: Sharm el-Sheikh, Hurghada, Marsa-Alam (charter)
Georgia: Tbilisi, Batumi
Greece: Patras, Heraklion, Rhodes
Montenegro: Tivat (charter)
Spain: Alicante, Barcelona
Turkey: Antalya (charter)
Ukraine: Kharkiv, Kherson, Kyiv-Zhuliany, Lviv, Odessa
Uzbekistan: Samarkand

Fleet

As of June 2021, Bees Airline operated the following aircraft:

See also
 List of airlines of Ukraine

References

External links

Defunct airlines of Ukraine
Airlines established in 2019
Airlines disestablished in 2022
Low-cost carriers
Ukrainian companies established in 2019
2022 disestablishments in Ukraine